Cottam is a village and civil parish in Nottinghamshire 8 miles east of Retford within the Bassetlaw district. The name is pronounced 'Cotum' locally.

The population of the civil parish in the 2011 Census was given as 108. To the south of the village is Cottam Power Station with 8 cooling towers, built between 1964 and 1968. Cottam is also close to Sundown Adventureland.

History
Cottam is described in the Domesday Book as comprising 8 households. Its Lord was Hardwulf of Cottam (also spelt Hardulf, Hardul and Heardwulf) in 1086 (before the Conquest) and Fulco of Lisors (after the Conquest). The tenant in chief in 1086 was Roger de Bully (Roger de Busli), who was given extensive lands in Nottinghamshire, Derbyshire and the Strafforth wapentake of Yorkshire that had previously belonged to a variety of Anglo-Saxon and Scandinavian Lords. Fulco of Lisors was known as 'Roger's Man' and was an important tenant of Roger of Bully. He was a witness of Roger of Bully's charter founding his priory of Blyth, as well as a donor of lands. His wife was called Albreda and they had a son, Robert.

Cottam was spelt 'Cotum' in 1280  but this is likely a literal spelling of the way the name is pronounced locally to this day.

In 1636 a widow of Cottam was prosecuted for being a ‘popish’ (Roman Catholic) recusant.

In White's Directory of 1844, Cottam was described as having 18 houses and 89 inhabitants. The population was unchanged in 1851.

In 1848 Cottam was described by Lewis as: "a small village and a township in South Leverton parish, Notts, on the M.S. & L.R., near the river Trent, 7¼miles E by S of East Retford, with a station on the railway, and a post office under Lincoln; money order office, Rampton; telegraph office, Sturton-le-Steeple. Acreage, 599; population, 81. The living is a vicarage, annexed to that of Littleborough, in the diocese of Southwell; joint gross value, £165. The church is small, and has a Norman doorway. There is also a Wesleyan chapel".

Wilson was unimpressed by Cottam, describing its church as "small and plain". He commented that at that time (1872) it had a railway station, comprised 19 houses and had a population of 86. The property value was £814.

The station mentioned by Lewis and Wilson (Cottam railway station) was demolished and the line closed between Clarborough Junction and Sykes Junction to passenger traffic in 1959. However, the line was kept open from the West to enable merry-go-round coal trains to Cottam Power Station.

Cottam's population had grown to 107 by 1887.

Cottam village was described in 1938 as:

Cottam power stations were built in 1964 on the land of the former Mickleholme Farm which was demolished. The power plants have been said to have an overbearing quality on the village by many, but some commentators have praised the modernist aesthetic of the towers and are regretful they are likely to be demolished and removed by 2025; electricity generation ceased in September 2019. Hilary Sylvester of Nottingham Civic Society's said of Nottinghamshire's Power Stations: "They provide a point in the landscape. People probably did not want them when they were first built but they've been there for so long they are a feature. Putting a building in the landscape doesn't necessarily ruin it, and an industrial building doesn't have to be awful."

Historic Buildings and Archaeology

Bassetlaw Council has placed much of Cottam within an area of Archaeological interest, noting: "Recognising the overall	high potential for the survival	of below-ground	archaeology in certain	parts of both Treswell and Cottom [sic], Bassetlaw District Council has identified a number of areas within the parish as Areas of Archaeological Interest."

The Church of the Holy Trinity
The Church of the Holy Trinity is a Grade II listed building (1967), which dates from the 12th century. It was restored in 1869 and again in 1890. Its listing describes it as being built of coursed rubble and dressed stone, with ashlar quoins and dressings, and a slate roof. It has a single bellcote that dates from 1890. There was a single bell hung in the bellcote that had the following inscription: 'GOD SAVE HIS CHVRCH 1704'. Until 1817 there were two bells hung in the bellcote.

The church contains a single war memorial, erected for the fallen of the parish in World War I. The memorial is made of marble and slate. The inscription read: 'This Memorial is Erected by the Parishioners of Cottam, in Proud and Grateful Memory of those from this Parish who fell in the Great War. 1914-18. George Fenton, Frank Howard, William Howard, Percy Kitchen. See that their names are not forgotten.'

The church font is also Grade II listed. Its listing says it dates from the 14th century, is Ashlar and Octagonal. The base is inscribed as follows: "Ancient font presented to Church by Archbishop …, 1918."

The church had a history of problematic priests. In 1538, Sir John Hercy wrote to Thomas Cromwell, begging him to take pity on the ‘poor men of Cottam’ who were threatened by a ‘lunatic priest’. In 1610 the churchwardens’ presentment complained of a minister who failed to read divine service, had allowed his son Euzebius (unlicensed) to expound service and was frequenting alehouses 'in verie scandalous sorte’.

The church was deconsecrated in 2002 and is now a private house.

Wesleyan Chapel
Cottam also has a former Wesleyan Methodist Chapel, built 1857. The chapel is now a private two-bedroom house.

Cottam in the News
According to the National Crime Agency, a man was found floating in the River Trent in Cottam on 15 July 1987. The body was decomposed, but described by police as being aged between 50 and 60, fair and greying, with stubble and false teeth. He was 178 cm in height and had a stocky build. The man has never been identified, and the investigation remains open (June 2018).

References

External links

Villages in Nottinghamshire
Civil parishes in Nottinghamshire
Bassetlaw District